"Unlasting" (stylized in all lowercase) is a song by Japanese pop singer LiSA. It was released as her sixteenth single digitally on October 21, 2019, and received a physical release on December 11, 2019. It reached number 4 on Oricon and number 6 on Japan Hot 100. It was used as the first ending theme song for the anime series Sword Art Online: Alicization - War of Underworld.

Release
On 6 October 2019, the official website of the anime Sword Art Online: Alicization - War of Underworld revealed about the ending theme song "Unlasting" that would be sung by LiSA. The song was released digitally on 21 October 2019, and received a physical release on 11 December 2019 on three edition; Regular edition, Limited edition and Limited anime edition. The single reached number 4 on Oricon, 6 on Japan Hot 100, and 5 on Japan Hot Animation with spent 17, 6 and 12 weeks respectively. The song will be featured in her fifth album Leo-Nine.

Music video
The music video for "Unlasting" was directed by Kentaro Osawa, and produced by Hiroshi Takayama. The video features  a heart-rending story of a breakup between a man and woman in the style of a short dramatic film, with some scene featuring them with rain effect. The video expanded their story from when they was a couple until they're breakup. Some scene feature LiSA singing in the room with haze effect. The video end when both of them parted ways, which the woman and the man seeing each other when they were  separated away.

Track listing

Regular edition

Limited edition

Limited anime edition

Personnel
Singer and bands
LiSA – Vocals, Lyrics (unlasting, Howl)
Hidenori Tanaka, Tomoya Tabuchi - Lyrics (KALEIDO, Chill-Chill-Dal-Da)
Masaki Nonomura - Erhu Arranger
Kanae Nozawa - Erhu performer
Shota Horie - Arranger, Other Instruments

Production
Nobuyuki Murakami – recording, mixing
Naoki Kawashima – assistant
Akihiro Shiba, TEMAS – mastering

Charts

Release history

References

LiSA (Japanese musician, born 1987) songs
2019 singles
2019 songs
Anime songs
Songs written by LiSA (Japanese musician, born 1987)
Sword Art Online